Zieleniec  is a village in the administrative district of Gmina Pokój, within Namysłów County, Opole Voivodeship, in south-western Poland.

The village has a population of 640.

References

Zieleniec